Dark Places is a 2015 American mystery film directed by Gilles Paquet-Brenner and written by Paquet-Brenner. It is based on Gillian Flynn's 2009 novel of the same name and stars Charlize Theron, Christina Hendricks, Nicholas Hoult, and Chloë Grace Moretz.

The film was released in France on April 8, 2015, and in the United States on August 7, 2015, by A24. The film received mixed reviews.

Plot 
In 1985 in rural Kinnakee, Kansas, 8-year old Libby Day is the sole survivor after her mother and older sisters are murdered. Responding to the police's leading questions, she says that her teenage brother, Ben, committed the crime. 

In the present, Libby has made a living from donations sent by strangers to "the little girl on the news"; donations are less frequent now that she is an adult and she is low on money. Lyle Wirth approaches Libby to make a personal appearance at his "True Crime" club. She reluctantly agrees to go for $700.

In 1985–prior to the murders–Ben comes to the breakfast table with dyed black hair. He has a tense relationship with his mother, Patty, and his eldest sister, Michelle, who taunts Ben about being a loner. Ben hangs out with Trey Teepano, a Satanist bookie. Meanwhile, their mother Patty learns that her farm is being foreclosed on, despite her best efforts.

In the present, most of the members of Wirth's club believe that Ben is innocent as his conviction was based entirely on Libby's testimony. Though she still believes in Ben's guilt, Libby agrees to work with the club in return for much needed money. Urged by Wirth to visit Ben in prison, Libby's curiosity about what motivated him to kill their family prods her to keep researching the case.

In 1985, Ben plans to run away with his pregnant girlfriend Diondra. Meanwhile, some young girls have accused Ben of molesting them. When Patty learns of the charges, she visits the main accuser, Krissi Cates, whose father is irate and wants to harm Ben. Patty is distraught and feels that she has failed her kids. 

At home, Runner, the estranged, alcoholic father of Patty's kids, is waiting for Patty to ask for money to leave town; he owes Trey the bookie more than he can repay. Runner attempts to rip Patty's heirloom ruby necklace from her neck but, unable to do so, beats her and steals money from her wallet.

In the present, Libby locates Runner in an abandoned factory where he lives with other homeless addicts and learns of Diondra's pregnancy from him. She also locates Krissi Cates, who eventually confesses to inventing the molestation accusations against Ben.

In 1985, Patty learns of a possible answer to her problems and meets with a stranger in the park late at night. The stranger is later revealed as Calvin Diehl, a serial killer known as the Angel of Debt, who murders people so that their families can collect on their life insurance policies. Unable to see another solution, Patty goes home and hides some money for Diehl as payment.

At the same time, Diondra learns about the accusations against Ben and convinces him to flee with her immediately. They go to Ben's house to steal some money but Michelle overhears them and threatens to tell Patty. Diondra suddenly attacks Michelle, choking her. Meanwhile, Diehl has also entered the house and stabs Patty in the hallway. When her middle daughter, Debby, rushes from the bedroom seeking help for Michelle, Diehl grabs the family shotgun and kills the young girl. The shot distracts Ben from his efforts to defend Michelle, whom Diondra strangles while Ben investigates the noise. 

In the present, Libby finds Diondra and Crystal, the daughter she had with Ben. Libby finds her mother's ruby necklace in Diondra's bathroom and realizes she is in danger. Crystal attacks her, but Libby escapes. She then learns Diehl's involvement from Wirth, whose club has been working on the Angel of Debt case. 

Libby visits Ben again in prison and they apologize to each other. She realizes he was trying to protect his unborn daughter by taking the blame for their family's murders. A news report confirms that Diondra has been arrested. Libby returns to the family farm where she grew up and Ben is exonerated and released from prison. Libby states that she does not intend to press charges against Crystal, who is yet to be found, as she understands her actions.

Cast

Production
Principal photography commenced in late August 2013 in Shreveport and Minden, Louisiana.

Release
Dark Places was released in France on April 8, 2015. In November 2014, it was announced A24 and DirecTV Cinema had acquired rights to the film. The film began airing on DirecTV Cinema on June 18, 2015, and was released in limited release and through video on demand on August 7, 2015.

Reception

Box office
The film grossed a total of $208,588 in the United States from 151 venues over the course of two weeks. Overseas, the film earned $4,882,264 for a worldwide total of $5,090,852.

Critical response
The site's critics' consensus reads: "Dark Places has a strong cast and bestselling source material, but none of it adds up to more than a mediocre thriller that gets tripped up on its own twists." Metacritic, which uses a weighted average, assigns a score of 39 out of 100 based on 19 critics, indicating "generally unfavorable reviews".

Peter Debruge of Variety wrote: "As heroines go, it’s refreshing to get one as complex as this: When psychologically scarred female characters do turn up in thrillers, they're usually little more than shivering victims who set a group of male cops in motion, but here, Libby does her own detective work, while Hendricks lends star power to the flashback scenes."  However, he called the film as a whole "a relative disappointment."

Most of the reviews were mixed.  David Lewis wrote in The San Francisco Chronicle, "Dark Places isn’t a disaster of a film. Instead, it’s the definition of average, and we wish it could have taken us to some more interesting places."  Katie Walsh wrote in The Chicago Tribune, "It feels like the film doesn't want to commit to either pure camp or stoic darkness, fluctuating between the two...The twists, turns and reveals in the mystery sustain interest in the film, which hops between present day to the day of the murders, interspersed with Libby's flashback of fleeing the house that night. But despite all the shocking developments, the resolution is rushed, and therefore farfetched and confounding."  Writing in the Toronto Star,  Bruce DeMara called the film "a reasonably suspenseful tale populated by a slew of sordid players, bringing an outsider’s view to the seamier side of middle America that actually comes across as both gritty and fresh."  Chris Nashawaty's review in Entertainment Weekly stated, " It isn’t terrible, exactly, but disappointing considering its cast and source. Instead, Dark Places just becomes an overstuffed, low-simmer potboiler with too many improbable detours and overly convenient twists."  The Observer critic Mark Kermode wrote, "Gilles Paquet-Brenner invests the split-time action with some brooding menace and the cinematographer, Barry Ackroyd, does his best to lend some urgency, even as things spiral from suspense into outright silliness." Bilge Ebiri wrote in Vulture.com, "There’s nothing particularly wrong with Dark Places: It’s cleanly directed, occasionally atmospheric, and mostly well acted.  But the film is also curiously lifeless, crammed tightly as it is with plot and structure — which becomes increasingly tedious.  Peter Bradshaw's review in The Guardian called the film a "middling screen adaptation. There are moments of macabre horror here, and interesting nods to Capote’s In Cold Blood, as well as America’s satanic abuse scare and the Robin Hood Hills case."

References

External links
 
 
 
 
 

2015 films
2015 drama films
2015 psychological thriller films
2015 thriller drama films
2010s mystery thriller films
American thriller drama films
American detective films
American mystery thriller films
English-language French films
American neo-noir films
Films about runaways
Films based on American novels
Films based on mystery novels
Films directed by Gilles Paquet-Brenner
Films produced by Charlize Theron
Films scored by BT (musician)
Films set in Kansas
Films set in 1985
Films set in 2015
Films shot in Louisiana
French nonlinear narrative films
American nonlinear narrative films
Entertainment One films
A24 (company) films
2010s English-language films
2010s American films
2010s British films
2010s French films